Gwen Akin (born 1950) is an American photographer. 

Her work is included in the collections of the Los Angeles County Museum of Art, the Harry Ransom Center, 
the Center for Creative Photography,
and the Museum of Fine Arts, Houston.

References

Living people
1950 births
20th-century American photographers
21st-century American photographers
20th-century American women artists
21st-century American women artists